Federico Piccitto (born 30 September 1976 in Ragusa) is an Italian politician.

Member of the Five Star Movement, Piccitto was elected Mayor of Ragusa at the 2013 Italian local elections and served from 26 June 2013 to 27 June 2018.

See also
2013 Italian local elections
List of mayors of Ragusa

References

External links
 

1976 births
Living people
Mayors of places in Sicily
People from Ragusa, Sicily